Fiano is a comune (municipality) in the Metropolitan City of Turin in the Italian region Piedmont, located about  northwest of Turin.

Fiano borders the following municipalities: Nole, Germagnano, Cafasse, Villanova Canavese, Vallo Torinese, Varisella, Robassomero, La Cassa, and Druento.

References

External links
 www.comune.fiano.to.it

Cities and towns in Piedmont